Yi So-yeon (born June 2, 1978) is a South Korean astronaut and biotechnologist who became the first Korean to fly in space. Upon return from her mission aboard the International Space Station (ISS), Yi continued as a KARI researcher attending the International Space University before retiring from the agency to pursue an MBA at the University of California, Berkeley Haas School of Business.

Biography
Yi So-yeon was born to father Yi Gil-soo and mother Jeong Geum-soon, and raised in Gwangju, South Korea.

Yi studied at Gwangju Science High School. She earned bachelor's and master's degrees with a focus  on mechanics at KAIST in Daejeon. Her doctorate in biotech systems was conferred on February 29, 2008 in a ceremony at KAIST although she was unable to be present due to her training commitments in Russia. In 2010, she enrolled in the MBA program at the Haas School of Business at the University of California, Berkeley In 2015 she taught at Everett Community College in Washington State as an Engineering Physics Professor.

Space career

Korean astronaut program

Yi was one of the two finalists chosen on December 25, 2006 through the Korean Astronaut Program. On September 5, 2007, the Korean Ministry of Science and Technology selected Ko San as the primary astronaut, and Yi So-yeon as backup, following performance and other tests during their training in Russia.

A change was made on March 7, 2008, when Yi was selected to train with the primary crew, and confirmed on March 10 the Ministry of Education, Science and Technology announced that Yi would replace Ko. This was after the Russian Federal Space Agency asked for a replacement, because Ko violated regulations several times at a Russian training center by removing sensitive reading materials and mailing one back to Korea. On April 8, 2008, Yi was launched into space on board Soyuz TMA-12 with two Russian cosmonauts. South Korea is reported to have paid Russia $20million for Yi's space flight. She is the third woman, after Helen Sharman of the United Kingdom and Anousheh Ansari an Iranian American, to be the first national from their country in space.

Terminology
Flying as a guest of the Russian government through a commercial agreement with South Korea, Yi's role aboard Soyuz and the ISS is referred to as a spaceflight participant in Russian Federal Space Agency and NASA documents and press briefings.

Mission
During her mission, Yi So-yeon carried out eighteen science experiments for KARI and conducted interviews and discussions with media. In particular, she took with her 1,000 fruit flies in a special air-conditioned container box (Konkuk University experiment). She monitored the way the changes in gravity and other environmental conditions alter the behaviour of the flies, or their genome. Other experiments involved the growth of plants in space, the study of the behaviour of her heart, and the effects of gravity change on the pressure in her eye and shape of her face. With a specially designed three-dimensional Samsung camera, Yi took six shots of her face every day to see how it swells in the different gravity. She also observed the Earth, and in particular the movement of dust storms from China to Korea. She also measured the noise levels on board the ISS.

South Korean scientists created a special low-calorie and vitamin-rich version of kimchi for Yi.

Return flight
At the end of the mission, Yi returned to Earth along with ISS crew members Peggy Whitson and Yuri Malenchenko aboard Soyuz TMA-11, on April 19, 2008. Due to a malfunction with the Soyuz vehicle, the craft followed a ballistic re-entry which subjects the crew to severe gravitational forces up to 10 times the amount experienced on Earth. All three survived, although requiring observation by medical personnel.

Yi was hospitalized after her return to Korea due to severe back pains.  Though many believed these pains were the result of the rough landing, they were in fact normal and expected.  They were the result of spinal re-compression.

Post-flight
After her flight, Yi worked as a researcher at KARI and as Korea's space ambassador with Ko San. She will receive income from future TV commercials. On October 4, 2008, Yi launched the International Institute of Space Commerce at a ceremony held in Douglas, Isle of Man.

In 2009, Yi became the first astronaut to attend the International Space University (ISU) Space Studies Program (SSP) at NASA Ames Research Center, held in conjunction with the inaugural class of the Singularity University (SU) Graduate Studies Program (GSP).

Based on her track record so early on in her career, Yi was listed as one of the Fifteen Asian Scientists To Watch by Asian Scientist Magazine in May 2011.

Resignation
On August 13, 2014, the Korean Aerospace Research Institute announced that Yi had resigned for personal reasons, ending the South Korean space program. In the interview, she gave two reasons as to why she resigned from the program: first, she was preparing to marry a Korean-American man; second, she wanted to study for an MBA.

Association of Spaceflight Professionals 
After receiving her MBA at the University of California, Berkeley Haas School of Business, Yi joined the Association of Spaceflight Professionals.

See also
 Timeline of space travel by nationality
 ARISS (Amateur Radio on the International Space Station)
 Spacefacts bio April 2018

References

External links

Spacefacts biography of Yi So-yeon
A series of interviews with Seoul Glow

1978 births
Living people
Women astronauts
KAIST alumni
People from Gwangju
South Korean astronauts
South Korean bioengineers
Haas School of Business alumni
Women bioengineers
Spaceflight participants
21st-century South Korean women scientists
21st-century South Korean scientists

hu:Yi So-yeon